Nikolaus Joseph Brahm (18 May 1754 – 29 June 1821) was a German zoologist and advocate. Brahm named several species of Coleoptera and Lepidoptera. There is no information about the fate of his collection, which was never cited in the literature.

References

External links 

 

18th-century German writers
18th-century German male writers
18th-century German zoologists
19th-century German writers
19th-century German male writers
19th-century German zoologists
1751 births
1821 deaths
German entomologists
German taxonomists